John Kim may refer to:
 John Euiwhan Kim (1933–2010), American theologian and pastor
 John Kim (professor) (born 1947), American professor of mechanical and aerospace engineering
 John Kim (actor) (born 1993), Australian actor of Korean descent

See also
 Jonathan Kim (born 1960), South Korean film producer
 Jonny Kim (born 1984), American Navy Seal, doctor, and astronaut